AFPA may refer to :

 Alberta Forest Products Association, a non-profit industry association operating out of Edmonton, Alberta, Canada
 Australian Federal Police Association, a registered industrial organisation, branch of the Police Federation of Australia
Australian Film Producers Association, now Screen Producers Australia

See also
 American Forest & Paper Association, (AF&PA), the American trade association of the forest products industry